Jack Hannath (born 9 July 1991) is a former professional Australian rules footballer who played for the Fremantle Football Club in the Australian Football League (AFL). He mainly played as a ruckman, and is currently playing in the SANFL.

Early life
He was predicted to be drafted in the 2009 AFL Draft, but was not selected. He continued to play for Centrals and was doing pre-season training with the Melbourne Football Club in Darwin when he was drafted by Fremantle with the 8th selection at the 2012 Pre-season Draft. Hannath started the 2013 season playing for Peel Thunder in the West Australian Football League (WAFL).

AFL career
Hannath made his AFL debut in Round 5, 2013 against Richmond at Patersons Stadium. In a one-point victory, Hannath took a strong mark in the final minute to repel a Richmond attack. He was delisted at the conclusion of the 2016 season.

Statistics

|- style="background-color: #EAEAEA"
! scope="row" style="text-align:center" | 2013
|
| 38 || 12 || 7 || 1 || 49 || 37 || 86 || 31 || 19 || 70 || 0.6 || 0.1 || 4.1 || 3.1 || 7.2 || 2.6 || 1.6 || 5.8
|-
! scope="row" style="text-align:center" | 2014
|
| 38 || 3 || 0 || 1 || 15 || 3 || 18 || 7 || 6 || 26 || 0.0 || 0.3 || 5.0 || 1.0 || 6.0 || 2.3 || 2.0 || 8.7
|- style="background-color: #EAEAEA"
! scope="row" style="text-align:center" | 2015
|
| 38 || 3 || 1 || 1 || 16 || 13 || 29 || 6 || 5 || 30 || 0.3 || 0.3 || 5.3 || 4.3 || 9.7 || 2.0 || 1.7 || 10.0
|-
! scope="row" style="text-align:center" | 2016
|
| 38 || 2 || 0 || 1 || 9 || 6 || 15 || 2 || 7 || 22 || 0.0 || 0.5 || 4.5 || 3.0 || 7.5 || 1.0 || 3.5 || 11.0
|- class="sortbottom"
! colspan=3| Career
! 20
! 8
! 4
! 89
! 59
! 148
! 46
! 37
! 148
! 0.4
! 0.2
! 4.4
! 3.0
! 7.4
! 2.3
! 1.8
! 7.4
|}

References

External links

1991 births
Living people
Fremantle Football Club players
Peel Thunder Football Club players
Australian rules footballers from South Australia
Central District Football Club players
People from Nuriootpa, South Australia